Songkran is the Thai New Year's national holiday. Songkran is on 13 April every year, but the holiday period extends from 14 to 15 April. In 2018 the Thai cabinet extended the festival nationwide to five days, 12–16 April, to enable citizens to travel home for the holiday. In 2019, the holiday was observed 12–16 April as 13 April fell on a Saturday. The word "Songkran" comes from the Sanskrit word , literally "astrological passage", meaning transformation or change. It coincides with the rising of Aries on the astrological chart and with the New Year of many calendars of Southeast and South Asia, in keeping with the Buddhist and Hindu Calendar. The New Year takes place at virtually the same time as the new year celebrations of many countries in South Asia like Bangladesh, China (Dai People of Yunnan Province), India (Baisakhi in Punjab, Bengal Gajan Utsav, Bengal Charak Utsav, Bengali New Year (Poyla Baisakh/Nababarsha) in West Bengal and Tripura, Bihu in Assam,Gudipadva in Maharashtra, Pana or Mahabisuba Sankranti in Odisha, Ugadi in Andhra Pradesh and Karnataka, Vishu in Kerala etc.), Laos, Myanmar, Nepal, and Sri Lanka.

In Thailand, New Year is now officially celebrated 1 January. Songkran was the official New Year until 1888, when it was switched to a fixed date of 1 April. Then in 1940, this date was shifted to 1 January. The traditional Thai New Year Songkran was transformed into a national holiday. Celebrations are famous for the public water fights framed as ritual cleansing.

Meaning
Songkran is a term derived from Sanskrit संक्रान्ति saṅkrānti meaning 'to move' or 'movement'. It derives from the movement of the sun from one position to another in the zodiac. According to its literal meaning in Sanskrit, a Songkran occurs every month. However, the period that Thai people refer to as Songkran happens when the sun moves from Pisces to Aries in the zodiac. The correct name for this period should actually be Maha Songkran ('great Songkran) because it coincides with the arrival of a New Year. The Songkran festival is, therefore, a celebration of the New Year in accordance with the solar calendar. The celebration covers a period of three days: 13 April is regarded as Maha Songkran, the day that the sun moves into Aries on the zodiac or the last day of the old year. The next day, 14 April is called Wan Nao, the transitional day between the old and the new years, and 15 April is called Wan Thaloeng Sok ( 'to begin a new era or year'), New Year's day itself.

Computation 
In 1989, the Thai cabinet fixed Songkran at 12–14 April, despite the correct starting date (13 April at 20:57). Songkran, however, was traditionally computed according to the method described in Suriyayart, the Thai version of Surya Siddhanta. The celebration starts when the sun enters Aries according to the sidereal zodiac system. This is called Maha Songkran day. The final day marks the new solar year and is called Wan Thaloengsok. The astrologers, local or royal, then make predictions about the economy, agriculture, rainfall, and political affairs according to observations between both days. The king, or Chief Royal Astrologer on the monarch's behalf, issued an official notification on the new year to the public. The announcement, called Prakat Songkran (Songkran notification), contained the information on Maha Songkran, Thaloengsok, the lunisolar calendar, and religious and royal ceremonies. The government strictly adhered to the announcement and arranged some ceremonies according to the computation made by the royal astrologer.

According to the scripture, 800 years equal 292,207 days. In other words, each solar year lasts 292,207 kammaja (lit. one produced by karma), where 1 kammaja equals 108 seconds and 800 kammaja corresponds to 1 solar day. Timekeeping began as Kali Yuga started in 3102 BCE (−3101 CE). At the start of each year, it is possible to compute the number of days since Kali Yuga commenced using the following formula:

The integer result is the count of days at New Year's Day, while the remainder indicates the time at which the new year begins (in kammaja), measured from the previous midnight.

Owing to a huge day number in the calculation, new calendar eras were devised to solve this problem, including the Minor Era (ME). 0 ME corresponds to 1181 BE, 638 CE or 3739 KE. Following the above equation, it follows that there were 1,365,702 days since the start of Kali Yuga. The remainder of the division suggests that the new year started at 373 kammaja after the previous midnight. This corresponds to 373/800 of a day or 11 hours, 11 minutes, and 24 seconds. In other words, 0 ME started at 11:11:24 on Sunday, 25 March 638 CE in the proleptic Gregorian calendar. The Julian day at the new year is computed according to the following formula:

The number can then be converted back into a date using an algorithm (see Julian day). Maha Songkran day is computed either by a lengthy process or by subtracting  by 2.165 days (2 days 3 hours 57 minutes 36 seconds). This can be rewritten as

A solar year lasts 292,207 kammaja or 365.25875 days every year. However, a Gregorian year lasts, on average, 292194 kammaja. The difference of 13 kammaja (23 minutes, 24 seconds) accumulates every year, causing the shift of Songkran towards the end of the calendar year. In 1600, 1700, 1800, 1900 and 2000, Maha Songkran was on 7 April 9 April, 10 April 12 and 13 April respectively.

Nowadays the royal palace has ceased to issue the Prakat Songkran, replacing it with a small calendar booklet given to the public on New Year's Day. Government Savings Bank still prints a one-page lunisolar calendar, which is different from the multiple-page solar calendar commonly seen. The calendar features the image of Nang Songkran with her vehicle and subordinates, led by a Chinese zodiac animal holding a flag with Thai script for that zodiac. It also contains a piece of comprehensive information on the correct Songkran day and religious days. Some astrologers, especially in northern Thailand, still issue their own Songkran notification containing predictions and other information. In 2013, the Chiang Mai Provincial Council decided to defy the government-set holiday by rescheduling the ceremony according to the correct calculation.

The following table lists the start and end dates of Songkran festival obtained from the formulae discussed above. The Chinese zodiac for each year is also given since it is also used in Thai astrology. However, the Chinese zodiac in Chinese astrology changes on Lichun, just before the Chinese New Year, in February, while Thai astrology uses the first day of fifth lunar month (roughly the new moon in late–March to early–April). Before the cut off date, astrologer uses the zodiac of the last year.

Origin 
According to the Buddhist scripture of Wat Pho, Songkran originated from the death of Kapila Brahma. In the olden days, there was a wealthy man and his neighbor, a drunkard. The drunkard, who had two sons, belittled the rich man for being childless. The rich man was humiliated and beseeched the Sun and the Moon gods to grant him a son. His attempts failed until he offered cooked rice to the tree god living in a banyan tree, who asked Indra to grant the man's wish. The child, named Thammabal (also Dhammapala), was born.

Thammabal was a clever child who learned three vedas, bird language and also taught people to avoid sin. Kapila Brahma learned of the child and wanted to test the child's cleverness. The god asked, "Where is the glory of men (sri) located in the morning, during the day, and in the evening?" The loser would have his head chopped off. The boy thought in vain for six days, but could not find a solution to the riddles. He lay beneath a sugar palm tree and overheard a conversation between a pair of eagles who planned to eat his corpse when he lost the bet. The female eagle asked her mate whether he knew the answer. He answered, "In the morning, the sri appears on the face, so people wash their faces every morning. At noon, the sri is at the chest where people spray perfume every noon. In the evening, the sri goes to the feet, so people wash their feet every evening." Thmmabal memorized the answer and gave it to Kapila Brahma the next day. Having lost, Kapila Brahma summoned his seven daughters and told them that he must cut his head off. However, if his head fell to earth, it would create an inferno that would engulf the world. If his head was thrown into the air, the rains would stop. And if his head was dropped into the ocean, all seawater would dry up. To prevent these calamities, he told his daughters to place his head on an elevated phan. Thungsa, his eldest child, stored her father's head in the cave in Mount Kailash.

Every year when the Sun enters Aries, one of Kapila Brahma's children, called the Nang Songkran for that year, and other angels form a procession. One of them takes the phan with Kapila Brahma's head. The lady stands, sits, reclines or sleeps on the back of the animal depending on the time. From the dawn to midday, the lady will stand on the back of her conveyance. After midday until the sunset, she will sit down. Between the sunset and midnight, the lady lies down on her vehicle but leaves her eyes open. After midnight, she sleeps. These postures and other details were previously drawn as part of the Prakat Songkran and now as part of the lunisolar calendar. The procession lasts for 60 minutes around Mount Meru. This is subsequently called Maha Songkran to distinguish from other Songkran that occur when the Sun moves from one to another zodiac. For simplicity, the name was later shortened as Songkran.

The following table lists the names and characteristics of Nang Songkran, which vary according to which day of the week Maha Songkran falls on in each year.

New year traditions 
The Songkran celebration is rich with symbolic traditions. Mornings begin with merit-making. Visiting local temples and offering food to the Buddhist monks is commonly practiced. On this specific occasion, performing water pouring on Buddha statues and the young and elderly is a traditional ritual, representing purification and the washing away of one's sins and bad luck. As a festival of unity, people who have moved away usually return home to their loved ones and elders. Paying reverence to ancestors is an important part of Songkran tradition.

The holiday is known for its water festival. Major streets are closed to traffic, and are used as arenas for water fights. Celebrants, young and old, participate in this tradition by splashing water on each other. Traditional parades are held and in some venues "Lady Songkran" or "Miss Songkran" is crowned. where contestants are clothed in traditional Thai dress.

In Thailand 

Central Region People in this region clean their houses when Songkran approaches. All dress up in colorful clothing or Thai dress. After offering food to the monks, people will offer a requiem to their ancestors. People make merit offerings such as giving sand to the temple for construction or repair. Other forms of merit include releasing birds and fish. Nowadays, people also release other kinds of animals such as buffaloes and cows. Phra Pradaeng hosts traditional ceremonies of Mon people such as parades in the colourful traditional outfits and folklore performances.

South Southerners have three Songkran rules: Work as little as possible and avoid spending money; do not hurt other persons or animals; do not tell lies.

North On 7 April, Baan Had Siew in Si Satchanalai District hosts the'Elephant Procession Ordination' event with a colourful parade where men dressed in the traditional clothes are taken to the temples on elephants. In northern Thailand 13 April is celebrated with gunfire or firecrackers to repel bad luck. On the next day, people prepare food and useful things to offer to the monks at the temple. People have to go to temple to make merit and bathe Buddha's statue and after that they pour water on the hands of elders and ask for their blessings.

East The eastern region has activities similar to the other part of Thailand, but people in the east always make merit at the temple throughout all the days of the Songkran Festival and create sand pagodas. Some people, after making merit at the temple, prepare food to be given to the elderly members of their family.

The Capital (Bangkok) The Khao San Road and Silom Road are the hubs for modern celebration of Songkran. The roads are closed for traffic, and posts equipped with water guns and buckets full of water. The party runs day and night.

Elsewhere 

Songkran is celebrated by the Malaysian Siamese community, particularly in the states of Kedah, Kelantan, Penang, Perak, Perlis and Terengganu where most Siamese are located.

Pana Sankranti, (Odia: ପଣା ସଂକ୍ରାନ୍ତି) also known as Maha bisuba Sankranti, is the traditional new year day festival of Buddhists and Hindus in Odisha, India.

The festival is celebrated as Sangken in northeastern areas of India and as Bizu, Boisuk, Shangrai, and Boisabi in the Chittagong Hill Tracts of Bangladesh, which is the traditional New Year's Day by the indigenous Hindu people and Buddhist community. The Sangken festival is celebrated by the Tai people — Khamti people Khamyang, Phake and Turung people.  The festival is also celebrated by Singpho, Tikhak (Tangsa) and Duoniya people. Sangken generally falls in the month of 'Naun Ha', the fifth month of the year of the Tai Lunar calendar coinciding with the month of April. It is celebrated in the last days of the old year and the lunar new year begins on the day just after the end of the festival.

Vishu, a Hindu religious festival, celebrated mainly in the South Indian State of Kerala (and some parts of Tamil Nadu), also falls during the same timeframe. It is predominantly a harvest festival.

In some villages in south India, especially Karnataka, a festival called "Okhali" or "Okhli" is celebrated in which every household keeps a barrel of water mixed with chalk and turmeric to throw on passers-by. The date of Okhali coincides with that of Songkran in Thailand and Thingyan in Myanmar, not with the dates of Holi, which is a north Indian festival.

Songkran is celebrated annually on the U.S. territory of Wake Island by Air Force members and American and Thai contractors.

In other calendars 
Songkran occurs at the same time as that given by Bede for festivals of Eostre—and Easter weekend occasionally coincides with Songkran (most recently 1979, 1990, and 2001, but not again until 2063.)

Controversies

Accidents 

Police statistics show that the death toll from road accidents doubles during the annual Songkran holiday. Between 2009 and 2013 there were about 27 road deaths per day during non-holiday periods and an average of 52 road deaths per day during Songkran. Thailand has the second-highest traffic fatality rate in the world, with 44 deaths per 100,000 residents. Approximately 70–80 percent of the accidents that occur during the long holiday period are motorcycle accidents. About 10,000 people per year die in motorcycle accidents.

The National Council for Peace and Order (NCPO) says a total of 110,909 people were arrested and 5,772 vehicles impounded at road safety checkpoints across the country between 9–16 April 2016. In 2018 the number of offenders arrested at 2,029 checkpoints had risen to 146,589. Of these, 39,572 had failed to wear crash helmets and 37,779 carried no driving licence. Reacting to the numbers, the prime minister "ordered stricter enforcement of the law"; the interior minister said he would "propose greater efforts in raising awareness as an additional measure, insisting that traffic laws were [already] strictly enforced"; and deputy prime minister Prawit Wongsuwan said he would "work harder to ensure motorcyclists wore helmets."

Arrests
 Police arrested a British tourist in Chiang Mai on the first day of the 2016 Songkran holiday, 13 April, for violating the junta's ban on indecent dress. In a water fight the culprit was topless, wearing only short pants, but no shirt. He was taken into custody, fined 100 baht, then released. Temperatures in Chiang Mai reached 41 °C that day.
 A man was arrested during Songkran 2016 for posting a video of a topless woman dancing during the 2015 Songkran festival. Police said Jakkrapatsorn Akkarapokanan, 29, was charged under the Computer Crime Act for posting the year-old video of a woman rolling up her wet shirt to let revelers touch her breasts. Jakkrapatsorn was released on a 100,000 baht bond. Police said they attempted to find the topless woman in the video to fine her 500 baht for indecency, but the one year statute of limitations had expired.

Intellectual property

Celebrate Singapore 
In 2014 "Celebrate Singapore," a large two-day Songkran-style water festival, was planned for Singapore and the event was promoted as the "largest water festival party in Singapore". However, controversy emerged when the Tourism Authority of Thailand (TAT) Deputy Governor for Tourism Products, Vilaiwan Twichasri, claimed that Thailand holds exclusive rights to celebrate Songkran and planned to consult with officials at the Department of Intellectual Property, Ministry of Commerce and Ministry of Culture to discuss a potential lawsuit. The Deputy Governor's view was supported by numerous Thai citizens on social media websites. Chai Nakhonchai, Cultural Promotion Department chief, pointed out that Songkran is a traditional festival shared by many countries throughout Southeast Asia, while historian Charnvit Kasetsiri stated that no single nation can claim ownership of a tradition. On 25 March 2014, the Bangkok Post reported that the Singaporean government had intervened in the festival's content and there would be no water-throwing, no water pistols and no public drinking. The festival was also reduced to a one-day event.

See also 
 Holi, an Indian holiday famous for its ritualized street fights with colored powder

Notes

References

Further reading 
 E-books
 Phraya Anuman Ratchathon (Yong Sathiankoset). (1954). "Amusements During Songkran Festival". Journal of the Siam Society (volume 42, part 1). pages 39–43.

External links 
 

April observances
Public holidays in Thailand
Festivals in Thailand
New Year celebrations
Observances on non-Gregorian calendars
Buddhist festivals in Thailand
Observances held on the new moon